Gloiodon is a genus of mushrooms in the family Bondarzewiaceae. It was first described by Finnish mycologist Petter Karsten in 1879.

References

External links

Russulales
Russulales genera
Taxa named by Petter Adolf Karsten